Else Hueck-Dehio (1897–1976) was a German authoress.

Life
Dehio was born on 30 December 1897 in Dorpat, Livonia in the Russian Empire. 

Else Dehio was the daughter of a Baltic German doctor, Karl Dehio. She initially qualified as a nurse, but then fled from her Baltic homeland to Berlin ahead of the Russian Revolution in 1918. During the rest of her life she lived in Berlin, Lüdenscheid and, from 1955, in Murnau in Upper Bavaria. From 1934 she wrote numerous stories, books for young people and novels, often with topics from her Baltic homeland. Her children's book Indian Summer (Indianersommer) was on the shortlist for German Youth Book Prize in 1966. In 1920 she married the manufacturer and later CDU politician, Richard Hueck (1893-1968), who was Mayor of Lüdenscheid in 1946.

Hueck-Dehio died on 30 June 1976 in Murnau.

Works
 Die Frau und die geistige Schöpferkraft. Essays. 1933.
 Die Hochzeit auf Sandnes. Roman. Verlag Neue Nation, Berlin 1934, new editions published by Eher-Verlag to 1944.
 Die Schwelle. Novelle. 1938.
 Der Kampf um Torge. Roman. Eher, Munich 1938. new editions to 1943.
 
 
 
 
 
 Nikolaus-Legende. Lucas Cranach, Munich 1960. New edn. 1961.
 
 Indianersommer. Salzer, Heilbronn 1965. New edn. 1966.
 Die goldenen Äpfel. Claudius-Verlag, Munich, 1969.

Literature
 
 Silke Pasewalck: Raumdarstellung und Raumsemantik in Else Hueck-Dehio's novel "Liebe Renata". In: Triangulum. Germanistisches Jahrbuch für Estland, Lettland und Litauen, Band 19 (2013), S. 137–152.
 </ref>

References

External links

German women writers
German-language writers
Writers of young adult literature
People from Lüdenscheid
Baltic nobility
Baltic-German people
1897 births
1976 deaths
Emigrants from the Russian Empire to Germany